Jonas Elmer (born 28 February 1988) is a Swiss footballer who currently works for FC Stäfa as a player-assistant coach.

Football career

Early career
Elmer was signed by English Premier League side Chelsea in the summer of 2005 from Grasshoppers. He featured regularly for the Chelsea reserve and youth teams in both the 2005–06 and 2006–07 seasons.

Elmer made his first start for Chelsea's first team when coming on from the substitutes bench in a pre-season fixture against A.C. Milan, where he played the remainder of the match. His second appearance was against Wycombe Wanderers on 13 July 2005. Chelsea went on to win the game 5–1. He also came on as a substitute to make his third appearance for the club four days later as Chelsea F.C. beat Portuguese club Benfica 1–0 in another pre-season fixture.

Elmer looked as though he could have a promising future at Chelsea and signed a new two-year contract in early April 2006.

Aarau
On 25 June 2007, Elmer traveled back to Switzerland and signed a two-year contract with FC Aarau

Sion
On 18 May 2010, it was made official that Elmer had signed a three-year contract with FC Sion.

Winterthur
In 2012, he joined FC Winterthur in the Swiss Challenge League and made 21 appearances.

Toronto FC
He signed with Toronto FC on 1 August 2013. He mutually parted ways with Toronto FC the following off-season.

Rapperswil-Jona
In July 2015, Elmer returned to Switzerland with FC Rapperswil-Jona.

Return to FC Stäfa
Having completed a distance learning degree in business administration in 2016, and since then worked as a property manager beside his football career, Elmer decided to terminate his contract with FC Rapperswil-Jona at the end of 2019 and put an end to his professional career to focus on his civil career. He continued playing for his former youth club, FC Stäfa, in the Swiss 3rd division, as a player-assistant coach.

Honours 
Sion
Swiss Cup: 2010–11

References

External links
FC Aarau profile 
football.ch profile
Player Profile FC Sion-Online

1988 births
Living people
Swiss men's footballers
Swiss expatriate footballers
Swiss expatriate sportspeople in Canada
Switzerland under-21 international footballers
Chelsea F.C. players
FC Aarau players
FC Sion players
AC Bellinzona players
Grasshopper Club Zürich players
FC Winterthur players
FC Biel-Bienne players
Toronto FC players
FC Rapperswil-Jona players
Swiss Super League players
Swiss Challenge League players
Swiss Promotion League players
Major League Soccer players
Footballers from Zürich
Association football defenders
Expatriate soccer players in Canada